Moscow Street Circuit is a street circuit which was used on 6 June 2015 during the ninth ePrix of Formula E. The current layout, which remains subject to FIA approval and track homologation, would place the track adjacent to the Kremlin, with the main straight running along the Moskva River. Other sites along the track include the Staraya Square, the Red Square, the Moscow Gostiny Dvor, and Saint Basil's Cathedral.

References

Sports venues in Moscow
Defunct motorsport venues
Motorsport venues in Russia
Formula E circuits
Moscow ePrix